Nahr-e Kut may refer to:
 Nahr-e Kut, Minubar
 Nahr-e Kut, Nasar